Jonaki Mon is a 2002 Indian Assamese drama film directed by Jibanraj Barman and produced by Dinesh Kumar Rajkhowa.

Cast 

 Bibhash Chakraborty
 Tanvi Sharma
 Nipon Goswami
 Mridula Baruah
 Chetana Das
 Tina Barla
 Jatin Bora (Guest appearance)
 Prastuti Parashar (Guest appearance)
 Barsha Rani Bishaya (Guest appearance)

Soundtrack 

The music soundtrack of the film was composed by Zubeen Garg except where noted. The songs were sung by Zubeen Garg, Arnab Chakrabarty, Krishnamani Nath, Jonkey Borthakur, Papori Sharma, Babita Sharma, Shashwati Phukan, Bhitali Das, Kashmiri Saikia Baruah as well as leading Bollywood playback singers Pamela Jain, Shaan and Sagarika Mukherjee.

References

2002 films
Films set in Assam
2000s Assamese-language films